Valley Forge Park station (also known as Port Kennedy station) is a former train station in Valley Forge, Pennsylvania. The station is visible from Sullivan's Bridge in the Valley Forge National Historic Park.  Valley Forge Park station was originally built by the Reading Railroad as Port Kennedy station, and later served the SEPTA diesel service extending from the Norristown section of the Manayunk/Norristown Line to Pottsville. Service was originally suspended prior to SEPTA taking over from Reading Railroad, but was opened in 1976 for the American bicentennial.  In 1981, the station was closed again when SEPTA discontinued the diesel service.

References

Former SEPTA Regional Rail stations
Former Reading Company stations
Railway stations closed in 1981
Former railway stations in Montgomery County, Pennsylvania